Tursunali Khaitmakhamatovich Rustamov (born 31 January 1990) is a Kyrgyzstani footballer who plays as a forward for Dordoi Bishkek.

Career

Club
On 23 February 2019, Rustamov signed for Khujand.

On 25 December 2019, FC Dordoi Bishkek announced the return of Rustamov for the 2020 season.

On 15 July 2022, Dordoi Bishkek announced the signing of Rustamov on a contract until the end of the season.

International
He is a member of the Kyrgyzstan national team. He made his debut in the match against Kazakhstan, on 1 June 2012. On 6 September 2013, Rustamov scored his first goal in a 1–3 away defeat friendly against Belarus.

Career statistics

International
Statistics accurate as of match played 16 November 2021

International goals
Scores and results list Kyrgyzstan's goal tally first.

References

External links
Team announcement at uff.uz (in Russian)
Tursunali Rustamov at Footballdatabase
Состав сборной Кыргызстана
footballdatabase.eu

1990 births
Living people
Kyrgyzstan international footballers
Kyrgyzstani footballers
Kyrgyzstani expatriate footballers
Footballers at the 2010 Asian Games
Association football forwards
FC Alga Bishkek players
FC Dordoi Bishkek players
FC Alay players
2019 AFC Asian Cup players
Asian Games competitors for Kyrgyzstan
Tajikistan Higher League players